Sultan station is a Via Rail flag stop station located in the small village of Sultan, Ontario, Canada, on the Sudbury – White River train.

References

Via Rail stations in Ontario
Railway stations in Sudbury District